Hergy Mayala (born October 21, 1995) is a Canadian professional gridiron football wide receiver for the New Orleans Breakers of the United States Football League (USFL).

College career 
Mayala played college football at Connecticut. He started in all regular season games as a junior and senior at Connecticut, and across his college career he totaled 113 receptions for 1,352 yards and 12 touchdowns. His 113 receptions place him sixth all-time at Connecticut since Connecticut moved from the FCS to the FBS.

Professional career

Calgary Stampeders
Mayala was selected in the first round, eighth overall, by the Calgary Stampeders in the 2019 CFL Draft. He played in his first professional game on June 15, 2019 against the Ottawa Redblacks. He scored his first professional touchdown on an eight-yard reception from Bo Levi Mitchell against the Saskatchewan Roughriders on October 11, 2019. He played in 16 regular season games in 2019 where he had 38 receptions for 562 yards and five touchdowns. He did not play in 2020 due to the cancellation of the 2020 CFL season. In 2021, he played in 13 out of 14 regular season games where he recorded 29 catches for 284 yards, but no touchdowns. He became a free agent upon the expiry of his contract on February 8, 2022.

Montreal Alouettes
On February 8, 2022, it was announced that Mayala had signed with his hometown team, the Montreal Alouettes. On February 14, 2023, Mayala was released by the Alouettes.

New Orleans Breakers
On February 15, 2023, Mayala signed with the New Orleans Breakers of the United States Football League (USFL).

References

External links
Montreal Alouettes bio

1995 births
Living people
American football wide receivers
Calgary Stampeders players
Canadian football wide receivers
Players of Canadian football from Quebec
Canadian football people from Montreal
UConn Huskies football players
Canadian people of Democratic Republic of the Congo descent
Black Canadian players of Canadian football
Montreal Alouettes players
New Orleans Breakers (2022) players